John "the Bull" Bramlett (July 7, 1941 – October 23, 2014) was an American football linebacker who played from 1965 to 1971 on four teams, the Denver Broncos, the Miami Dolphins, and the Boston Patriots in the American Football League (AFL) and the Patriots and the Atlanta Falcons in the National Football League (NFL). He was a two-time AFL All-Star. Bramlett served as a minister before his death.

Bramlett was an All-State and All-American at Humes High School in Memphis and played college football at Memphis State University (now the University of Memphis), where he was named an honorable mention All-American his senior year.  Bramlett signed a professional baseball contract with the St. Louis Cardinals, but was kicked out of baseball after a few years after getting into trouble. Bramlett then signed a contract with the Denver Broncos and was named runner-up AFL Rookie of the year behind Joe Namath in 1965. 

Bramlett only lasted two seasons with the Broncos, making one appearance in the Pro Bowl before being traded to the Miami Dolphins for a fourth-round pick in the 1968 NFL Draft.  He played two seasons with Miami, making another Pro Bowl appearance, before being traded to the Patriots along with quarterback Kim Hammond in exchange for Nick Buoniconti in 1969.

With the Patriots, Bramlett was named the Most Valuable Player for the team in 1970, but also got in more trouble and was nicknamed the "Meanest Man in Football." . Bramlett was then traded to the Green Bay Packers for Rich Moore. However, he balked at reporting to Green Bay and was released by the Packers before the 1971 season. He was picked up by the Atlanta Falcons and played one season for them before retiring. 

Bramlett is a member of the Tennessee Sports Hall of Fame.

Post-football career

In 1973, Bramlett became a Christian and abandoned his wild lifestyle.  He was active in Christian ministry for many years. He resided in Memphis with his wife, Nancy, until his death. He had two sons, Don and Andy. His ministry was John Bramlett Ministries.

Larry Csonka and Jim Kiick, who were rookies on the Dolphins in 1968, tell several amusing stories about Bramlett in their book Always on the Run.

Bramlett also wrote his own autobiography, called Taming the Bull: The John "Bull" Bramlett Story (Thomas Nelson Publishers, 1989). In 1990, his story was dramatized through Pacific Garden Mission's Unshackled! radio ministry, airing as program #2070.

Death
Bramlett died on October 23, 2014, in Memphis, according to the Shelby County mayor's office.

See also
List of American Football League players

References
 
 A quick timeline of Dolphins History Retrieved March 7, 2006
 A biography of Bramlett Retrieved March 7, 2006

External links
http://www.pro-football-reference.com/players/BramJo00.htm
http://www.bramlett.org/

1941 births
2014 deaths
American football linebackers
Denver Broncos (AFL) players
Miami Dolphins players
Boston Patriots players
Atlanta Falcons players
American Football League All-Star players
Memphis Tigers football players
Humes High School alumni
American Football League players